Adebayo Linford Kazim "Ade" Azeez (born 8 January 1994) is an English professional footballer who plays as a striker for Welling United. He began his career with Charlton Athletic, spending time on loan to Wycombe Wanderers, Leyton Orient, Torquay United and Dagenham & Redbridge before being released in 2014. He then played for AFC Wimbledon, making 85 appearances, before signing for Partick Thistle in 2016. He has represented the England under-19 team.

Early life
Azeez was born in Sidcup, and attended Coopers Technology College in Chislehurst both in South East London. As a youngster he was a promising gymnast, and trained at Bromley Valley Gymnastics Centre before leaving to concentrate on football. He moved to his local club, Rivercray and it was from here that he was spotted as a talent by Charlton Athletic and signed a scholarships in 2010. Azeez is of Nigerian descent.
Ade Azeez has a son named Ade Junior, aged 4 years old with his partner who he met when they were both 15 years old.

Club career

Charlton Athletic
Azeez joined Charlton Athletic at the age of 14 and he progressed through the ranks before signing a professional contract in the summer of 2011. On 22 November 2012, Azeez was loaned to League Two side Wycombe Wanderers until January 2013. Charlton's Manager Chris Powell believed it was a good move for Azeez and that he could learn from the experience. He made his professional debut two days later, coming on as a 76th-minute substitute to replace Joel Grant in a 3–0 win against Burton Albion. However, as he made his first start in the quarter final of the Southern Section of Football League Trophy against Yeovil Town, which they lost 2–0, Azeez sustained a hamstring injury in the 25th minute and had to come off.

Soon after Charlton rejected an offer to have his loan with Wycombe extended, Azeez made his debut for Charlton Athletic in the 1–0 home defeat to Huddersfield Town in the FA cup, replacing Bradley Wright-Phillips in the 78th minute. After making his debut, Azeez said making his debut was something that he wanted to do at the club and was thankful to Powell for giving him the opportunity.

On 18 January 2013 he signed on loan for Leyton Orient, and made his only appearance for the club in a 2–0 away defeat at Doncaster Rovers the following day. Azeez's loan spell with Leyton Orient came to an end on 18 February 2013.

Azeez received a number 38 shirt for the 2013–14 season. On 26 September 2013, Azeez joined League Two side Torquay United on a one-month youth loan. Two days later he scored his first professional goal after coming on for Torquay in their 2–1 defeat to Newport County. A week later, on 14 October 2013, Azeez scored again, in a 3–2 loss against Wycombe Wanderers. Having scored twice in six games, Azeez had his loan spell with Torquay United extended for a further month. After this extension Azeez returned to Charlton.

On 8 February 2014 he signed for Dagenham & Redbridge on a one-month youth loan. Two days later, on 10 February 2014, Azeez made his debut for the club, in a 2–0 loss against Hartlepool United. On 10 March 2014, Azeez extended his loan with the "Daggers" for a further month, until 5 April 2014. Days after extending his deal, on 11 March 2014, he scored his first goal for the club and then scored another, in a 2–1 win over Bristol Rovers. His loan was extended even further on 9 April 2014, this time until the end of the 2013–14 season. In the last game of the season Azeez scored his third goal for the club in a 3–2 win over Cheltenham Town.

On 22 May 2014 he was released from Charlton Athletic in the summer upon expiry of his contract.

AFC Wimbledon
On 26 June 2014 Azeez signed with League Two side AFC Wimbledon on a free transfer. Upon joining the club, Azeez was given the number fourteen shirt ahead of the new season.

After being an unused substitute in the opening game of the season, Azeez made his Wimbledon debut against Luton Town, where he came on for Matt Tubbs in a 1–0 victory. Azeez scored his first Wimbledon goal on 30 August 2014, in a 3–2 defeat against Stevenage, followed up scoring in the next game against Carlisle United. Azeez scored two months later on 7 October 2014 against Milton Keynes Dons in a 3–2 victory. Two months later on 28 December 2014, Azeez scored twice, in a 4–1 win over Exeter City. Azeez then scored, in a 2–1 win over Accrington Stanley on 24 January 2015. His seventh goal of the season came on 14 April 2015, in a 1–1 draw against Plymouth Argyle. Spending much of the season as an impact substitute, he quickly became popular with the club's fans, with his pace often panicking tiring defenders.

Partick Thistle
Ade Azeez signed for Scottish Premiership side Partick Thistle on 15 June 2016. He was Alan Archibald's first summer signing of the 2016–17 season. Azeez scored his first goal for Thistle in a 4–1 away win over Stenhousemuir in the Scottish League Cup. Azeez scored his first league goal for Thistle in a 2–0 away win against Dundee at Dens Park, Azeez opened the scoring with a first half header. Azeez scored his second league goal of the season during a shock 1–1 draw with champions Celtic at Celtic Park. In all competitions, Azeez made 46 appearances for the Jags scoring three goals.

Cambridge United
On 5 July 2017 Partick Thistle accepted an undisclosed fee for Azeez from Cambridge. On 23 February 2018 Azeez joined Dover Athletic on loan. The loan was subsequently extended to the end of the 2017–18 season.

Newport County
On 31 January 2019 Azeez joined Newport County on a two year deal for an undisclosed fee. He made his Newport debut on 23 February 2019 in the 2–0 League Two defeat against Milton Keynes Dons as a second half substitute. He scored his first goal for Newport on 2 March 2019 in the 2–0 win against Carlisle United in League Two. He was part of the team that reached the League Two playoff final at Wembley Stadium on 25 May 2019, although he was an unused substitute in the final. He was injured in July 2019, and ruled out for 6 months. On 11 February 2020, having recovered from the injury, Azeez joined Torquay United on loan until the end of the 2019–20 season. On 14 September 2020 his contract at Newport was terminated by mutual consent.

Dover Athletic
On 3 October 2020, Azeez joined National League side Dover Athletic, where he had previously spent time on loan, being one of four new signings on the day of the new season commencement. He made his debut later that day in an opening day 1-0 victory over Notts County. On 27 October 2020, he scored his first goal back at the club with the winner in a 3–2 victory over Eastleigh. Following's Dover's decision to not play any more matches in the 2020–21 season, made in late January, and subsequent null and voiding of all results, on 5 May 2021 it was announced that Azeez was out of contract and had left the club.

Dartford
On 16 June 2021, Azeez joined National League South side Dartford ahead of the 2021–22 season. After scoring seven goals at a rate of one every 88 minutes, Azeez was awarded the league's Player-of-the-Month award for August/September 2021.

On 27 May 2022, Azeez announced he would leave the club following the end of the 2021–22 season.

Welling United
On 31 May 2022, Azeez joined National League South side Welling United ahead of the 2022–23 season.

International career
On 19 September 2012, Azeez earned a call-up by England under-19. Azeez made his debut for England on 28 September 2013, where he set up the third goal, as they beat Faroe Islands under-19, 6–0. Azeez added two more caps for England under-19 against Ukraine under-19 on 1 October 2012 and another against Finland under-19, where he assisted the only goal in the game on 13 November 2012.

Career statistics

Honours
AFC Wimbledon
Football League Two play-offs: 2016

Dartford
Kent Senior Cup: 2019–20, 2021–22

Individual
National League South Player of the Month: August/September 2021

References

External links

Living people
English footballers
Footballers from Sidcup
Association football forwards
English Football League players
Scottish Professional Football League players
National League (English football) players
Charlton Athletic F.C. players
Wycombe Wanderers F.C. players
Leyton Orient F.C. players
Torquay United F.C. players
Dagenham & Redbridge F.C. players
AFC Wimbledon players
Partick Thistle F.C. players
Cambridge United F.C. players
Newport County A.F.C. players
Dover Athletic F.C. players
Dartford F.C. players
Welling United F.C. players
England youth international footballers
Black British sportspeople
1994 births
English sportspeople of Nigerian descent
English people of Yoruba descent
Yoruba sportspeople